Girolamo Sarriano, C.R. (1580–1627) was a Roman Catholic prelate who served as Bishop of Vico Equense (1611–1627).

Biography
Girolamo Sarriano was born in Naples, Italy in 1580 and ordained a priest in the Congregation of Clerics Regular of the Divine Providence. On 31 January 1611, he was appointed during the papacy of Pope Paul V as Bishop of Vico Equense. He served as Bishop of Vico Equense until his death on 23 July 1627. While bishop, he was the principal co-consecrator of Cristoforo Caetani, Coadjutor Bishop of Foligno (1623).

References

External links and additional sources
 (for Chronology of Bishops) 
 (for Chronology of Bishops)  

17th-century Italian Roman Catholic bishops
Bishops appointed by Pope Paul V
1580 births
1627 deaths
Clergy from Naples
Theatine bishops
16th-century Neapolitan people
17th-century Neapolitan people